Lee Kemp may refer to:

 Leroy Kemp (born 1956), American sport wrestler